When an item is bought as is, it is bought in its present state. The term may also refer to:
 As/Is, a 2004 live album by John Mayer
 As Is (play), by William M. Hoffman
 As Is (film), adaptation directed by Michael Lindsay-Hogg
 As Is (Nitzer Ebb EP)
 As Is (The Bicycles EP)
 As Is (album), an album by Manfred Mann

See also
 Aziz